This 2007 AFF Championship qualification was held in Bacolod, Philippines between 12 and 20 November 2006 for the lower-ranked teams in Southeast Asia. All teams play in a round-robin tournament format and the winner and runner-up of the group qualify for the final tournament.

Venue

Qualification 
 All times are Philippine Standard Time (PST)–UTC+8
 Brunei was represented by 2005–06 Brunei Premier League champions QAF FC.

Qualified Teams 
Teams who finished Top 2 on the group will qualify to the main tournament.

Goalscorers 

6 goals
  Phil Younghusband

3 goals
  Adelio Maria Costa

2 goals
  Adie Mohammed Salleh
  Chan Rithy
  Hem Samchay
  Teab Vathanak
  Visay Phaphouvanin
  Vilasock Phothilath
  Sounthalay Saysongkham
  Sathongyot Sisomephone
  Emelio Caligdong
  Christopher Greatwich

1 goal
  Hardi Bujang
  Mardi Bujang
  Kamarul Ariffin Ramlee
  Riwandi Wahit
  Sam El Nasa
  Chandalaphone Liepvisay
  Saynakhonevieng Phommapanya
  Kaysone Soukhavong
  Alexander Borromeo
  Anton del Rosario
  Ariel Zerrudo
  Anatacio Belo
  Antonio Ximenes

References 
General

 "ASEAN Football Championship 2006". AseanFootball.org. ASEAN Football Federation. Retrieved 10 March 2010.
 "AFF Asean Football Championship 2007 - Singapore / Thailand". Futbol Planet. Retrieved 10 March 2010.

Specific

Qual
Qual
2006
Sports in Negros Occidental
2006 in Philippine football